Vasilyevsky is a rural locality (a settlement) in Alexandrovskoye Rural Settlement, Talovsky District, Voronezh Oblast, Russia. The population was 120 as of 2010.

Geography 
It is located on the right bank of the Sukhaya Chigla River, 2 km WNW from Talovaya.

References 

Rural localities in Talovsky District